The Dove Shack is a G-funk group from Long Beach. Consisting of C-Knight, Bo-Roc and 2Scoops, the group made their debut with the song "This Is the Shack" on Warren G's album Regulate...G Funk Era. Under the same name they released their first album in 1995 with the substantial hit single "Summertime in the LBC" featuring Arnita Porter. They later contributed to a few compilations, and released Reality Has Got Me Tied Up in 2006.

Discography

Studio albums

Solo projects
C-Knight – Knight Time (2001)
2Scoop – It's About Time (2010)
Bo Roc – My Music, My Soul  (2010)
Bo Roc – Loves for Free EP with Sabotawj (2011)
Bo Roc – Loves for Free II EP with Mr. Milky (2015)

Singles

Guest appearances

Soundtrack appearances

Videography

Music videos

References

Crips
Hip hop groups from California
Musicians from Long Beach, California
Gangsta rap groups
G-funk groups